Events from the year 1902 in the United States.

Incumbents

Federal Government 
 President: Theodore Roosevelt (R-New York)
 Vice President: vacant
 Chief Justice: Melville Fuller (Illinois)
 Speaker of the House of Representatives: David B. Henderson (R-Iowa)
 Congress: 57th

Events

January–March
 January 3
 The first college football bowl game, the Rose Bowl between Michigan and Stanford, is held in Pasadena, California.
 Nathan Stubblefield demonstrates his wireless telephone device in Kentucky.
 January 8 – A train collision in the New York Central Railroad's Park Avenue Tunnel kills 17, injures 38, and leads to increased demand for electric trains.
 January 28 – The Carnegie Institution is founded in Washington, D.C., to promote scientific research with a $10 million gift from Andrew Carnegie.
 February 9 – Fire levels 26 city blocks of Jersey City, New Jersey.
 February 18 – U.S. President Roosevelt prosecutes the Northern Securities Company for violation of the Sherman Act.
 February 22 – Senators Benjamin Tillman and John L. McLaurin, both of South Carolina, have a fist fight while Congress is in session.  Both Tillman and McLaurin are censured by the Senate on February 28.
 February – A commission on yellow fever announces that the disease is carried by mosquitoes.
 March 10 – A Circuit Court decision ends Thomas Edison's monopoly on 35 mm movie film technology.

April–June
 April 2 – The Electric Theatre, the first movie theater in the United States, opens in Los Angeles, California.
 April 7 – The Texas Oil Company Texaco is founded.
 April 14 – The first J. C. Penney department store opens in Kemmerer, Wyoming.
 May 15 – It is claimed that in a field outside Grass Valley, California, Lyman Gilmore achieves flight in a powered airplane (a steam-powered glider). There is no surviving evidence to verify this claim.
 May 20 – Cuba gains independence from the United States.
 May 22 – Crater Lake National Park is established in Oregon.
 June 2 – The coal strike of 1902 begins in the anthracite coalfields of eastern Pennsylvania.
 June 13 – Minnesota Mining and Manufacturing, predecessor of global consumer goods brand 3M, begins trading as a mining venture at Two Harbors in the United States.
 June 15 – The New York Central railroad inaugurates the 20th Century Limited passenger train between Chicago and Grand Central Terminal in New York City.
 June 17 – The Newlands Reclamation Act funds irrigation projects for the arid lands of 17 states in the American West.
 June 24 – Target Corporation, the department store chain, is founded.

July–September
 July 1 – The Philippine Organic Act becomes law, providing that the lower house of the Philippine legislature will be elected after the insurrection ends.
 July 2 – The Philippine–American War ends.
 July 8 – The United States Bureau of Reclamation is established within the U.S. Geological Survey.
 July 10 – The Rolling Mill Mine disaster in Johnstown, Pennsylvania kills 112 miners.
 July 17 – Willis Carrier devises air conditioning in New York City.
 August 22 – Theodore Roosevelt becomes the first American President to ride in an automobile, a Columbia Electric Victoria through Hartford, Connecticut.
 September 19 – Shiloh Baptist Church disaster: 115 people are killed during a stampede at the church in Birmingham, Alabama.

October–December
 October 21 – A 5-month strike by the United Mine Workers ends.
 October 24 – Delta Zeta Sorority is founded at Miami University in Oxford, Ohio.
 November 16 – A newspaper cartoon inspires creation of the first teddy bear by Morris Michtom in the U.S.
 November 30 – On the American frontier, the second-in-command of Butch Cassidy's Wild Bunch, Harvey Logan ("Kid Curry"), is involved in a shoot out in Knoxville, TN and escaped.
 December – The Venezuela Crisis of 1902–1903 occurs (until February 1903), in which Britain, Germany and Italy sustain a naval blockade on Venezuela in order to enforce collection of outstanding financial claims. This prompts the development of the Roosevelt Corollary to the Monroe Doctrine.

Undated
 The Potawatomi Zoo in South Bend, Indiana, begins as a duck pond.
 The First Goodwill Industries Store is opened in Boston, Massachusetts by Rev. Edgar J. Helms of Morgan Methodist Chapel.

Ongoing
 Progressive Era (1890s–1920s)
 Lochner era (c. 1897–c. 1937)
 Philippine–American War (1899–1902)

Births

 January 4 – John A. McCone, CIA Director from 1961 to 1965 (died 1991)
 January 24 – E. A. Speiser, biblical scholar (died 1965) 
 February 6 – George Brunies, jazz trombonist (died 1974)  
 February 13 – Blair Moody, U.S. Senator from Michigan from 1951 to 1952 (died 1954)
 February 19
 Kay Boyle, writer (died 1992)
 Eddie Peabody, musician (died 1970)  
 February 27
 Ethelda Bleibtrey, Olympic swimmer (died 1978)
 John Steinbeck, novelist (died 1968)
 March 4 – Russell Reeder, soldier and author (d. 1998)
 March 16 – Leon Roppolo, jazz clarinetist (died 1943)
 March 17 – Bobby Jones, amateur golfer (died 1971)
 March 23 – Philip Ober, actor (died 1982) 
 March 24 – Thomas E. Dewey, 47th Governor of New York, 1948 Republican presidential nominee (died 1971)
 April 11 – Quentin Reynolds, journalist (died 1965)
 April 2 – David Worth Clark, U.S. Senator from Idaho from 1939 to 1945 (died 1955)
 April 27 – Harry Stockwell, actor and singer (died 1984) 
 May 6 – Harry Golden, Ukrainian-born American journalist (died 1981) 
 May 11 – Dick Curtis, actor (died 1952) 
 May 15 – Richard J. Daley, Mayor of Chicago from 1956 (died 1976)
 May 21 – Earl Averill, baseball player (died 1983)  
 May 27 – Gladys Pearl Baker, film editor and mother of actress Marilyn Monroe (died 1984)
 June 2
 James T. Berryman, political cartoonist, recipient of the 1950 Pulitzer Prize for Editorial Cartooning (died 1971)
 Rosa Rio, organist and composer (died 2010) 
 July 4 – George Murphy, U.S. Senator from California from 1965 to 1971 (died 1992)
 August 1 – Harold D. Schuster, film director (died 1986)  
 August 4 – Clara Peller, actress (died 1987) 
 August 18  – Margaret Murie, environmentalist and author (died 2003)
 September 7 – Roy Barcroft, actor (died 1969) 
 October 3 – Waldo McBurney, America's oldest worker (died 2009) 
 October 5 – Ray Kroc, businessman, founder of McDonald's (died 1984)
 October 13 – Arna Wendell Bontemps, writer (died 1973) ***
 October 25 – Henry Steele Commager, historian (died 1998)  
 November 14 – Pua Kealoha, Olympic swimmer (died 1989)
 November 19 – Trevor Bardette, actor (died 1977)  
 November 23 – Aaron Bank, colonel (died 2004)  
 December 5 – Strom Thurmond, 103rd Governor of South Carolina (died 2003)
 December 9 – Margaret Hamilton, actress (died 1985)
 December 14 – Frances Bavier, stage and television actress (died 1989)
 December 15 – Bernard L. Austin, admiral (died 1979) 
 December 23 – Norman Maclean, author (died 1990)
 December 27 – Carman Maxwell, animator and voice actor (died 1987)  
 December 28 – Mortimer Adler, philosopher (died 2001)

Deaths
 January 15 – Alpheus Hyatt, zoologist and paleontologist (born 1838) 
 February 18 – Charles Lewis Tiffany, founder of Tiffany & Co. (born 1812)
 March 12 – John Peter Altgeld, 20th Governor of Illinois (born 1847)
 March 14 – Daniel H. Reynolds, Confederate Brigadier General (born 1832)
 April 3 – Esther Hobart Morris, first women justice of the peace in the United States (born 1814)
 April 27 – Julius Sterling Morton, 3rd United States Secretary of Agriculture (born 1832)
 May 5 – Bret Harte, short-story writer and poet (born 1836)
 May 26 – Almon Brown Strowger, inventor (born 1839)
 June 5 – Louis J. Weichmann, chief witness for the prosecution in the trial of the assassins of Abraham Lincoln (born 1842)
 July 27 – Packy Dillon, baseball player (born 1853)
 August 10 – James McMillan, Canadian-born U.S. Senator from Michigan from 1889 to 1902 (born 1838)
 September 26 – Levi Strauss, founder of Levi Strauss & Co. (born 1829)
 October 26 – Elizabeth Cady Stanton, suffragist (born 1815)
 November 22 – Walter Reed, U.S. Army physician (born 1851)
 November 27 – George S. Cook, prominent early American photographer (born 1819)
 November 29 – John Elliott Ward, politician and diplomat (born 1814)
 December 4 – Charles Dow, founder of Dow Jones & Company and The Wall Street Journal (born 1851)
 December 7 – Thomas Nast, political cartoonist (born 1840)
 December 14 – Julia Grant, First Lady of the United States (born 1826)
 December 22 – Dwight M. Sabin, U.S. Senator from Minnesota from 1883 to 1889 (born 1843)
 December 26 – Mary Hartwell Catherwood, author and poet (born 1849)

See also
 List of American films of 1902
 Timeline of United States history (1900–1929)

References

Further reading
 
 . (Covers events May 1898-June 1905)

External links
 

 
1900s in the United States
United States
United States
Years of the 20th century in the United States